EMEA College of Arts and Science, also known simple as E.M.E.A College, is an arts and science college located in the village Kumminiparamba, Malappuram district, Kerala, India. It was established in 1983.

Location 
The college is situated at Kumminiparamba, near Kondotty, less than {{convert|500|m} nearest airport only big calicut international airport

Departments
The institute comprises the following departments:
 English
 Economics
 Commerce
 West Asian Studies
 Arabic
 Malayalam
 Hindi
 Mathematics
 Political Science
 Physical Education
 Biochemistry
 Biotechnology
 Microbiology
 Computer Science
 Statistics
 Computer Application
 Journalism
 Business Administration
 BVoc Professional Accounting & Taxation
 BVoc Logistics Management
 BVoc Islamic Finance
 Mathematics & Physics (Double Main)

Affiliation and accreditation
EMEA College of Arts and Science is affiliated with Calicut University. It is accredited by the National Assessment and Accreditation Council (NAAC) with an A grade.

Notable alumni
 Anas Edathodika, Footballer

See also

References

External links 
 
University of Calicut
University Grants Commission
National Assessment and Accreditation Council

Colleges affiliated with the University of Calicut
Arts and Science colleges in Kerala
Universities and colleges in Malappuram district
1983 establishments in Kerala
Educational institutions established in 1983